Linda Marie Bell (born 1967/1968) is an American lawyer from Nevada who serves as a justice of the Nevada Supreme Court. Bell previously served as the chief judge of the Nevada Eighth Judicial District.

Education 

Bell graduated with honors from Bonanza High School. She  graduated with honors from the University of Nevada, Reno, with a degree in psychology. She received a Juris Doctor magna cum laude from the University of San Diego School of Law where she served as an articles editor of the University of San Diego Law Review. Bell was admitted to the Nevada State Bar in October 1993. In 2008, she graduated from the Las Vegas Chamber of Commerce Leadership Las Vegas program.

Career 

While in law school, Bell worked for the Clark County District Attorney's office and the San Diego Public Defender's office. Bell served as a public defender for twelve years and spent five years as a Clark County Public Defender. Since 2011, Bell has taught criminal law and criminal procedure at the University of Nevada, Las Vegas. In November 2008, Bell was elected as a judge of the Eighth Judicial District Court, taking her seat in January 2009. She was elected chief judge in 2019.

Nevada Supreme  Court 

In January 2022, Bell announced her candidacy for the Nevada Supreme Court. Bell ran unopposed for Seat A of the Nevada Supreme Court.

References

External links 

1960s births
Living people
Year of birth missing (living people)
Place of birth missing (living people)
20th-century American women lawyers
20th-century American lawyers
21st-century American women judges
21st-century American judges
21st-century American women lawyers
21st-century American lawyers
Justices of the Nevada Supreme Court
Nevada lawyers
Nevada state court judges
Public defenders
University of Nevada, Las Vegas faculty
University of Nevada, Reno alumni
University of San Diego School of Law alumni